Devils Backbone is a mountain located in the Catskill Mountains of New York southeast of Delhi. Scotch Mountain is located northwest, and Fyffe Cobble is located west-southwest of Devils Backbone.

References

Mountains of Delaware County, New York
Mountains of New York (state)